World Airlines was an airline that briefly operated out of London City Airport in 1996. Owner Chanuka Dilshan.

History
World Airlines started operations on 13 May 1996 with a four-times-a-day service from London City Airport to Amsterdam. The airline used two leased British Aerospace 146-200 aircraft. By the end of 1996, the airline had ceased to operate.

Fleet
 2 x BAe 146-200

References

External links 
 

Defunct airlines of the United Kingdom
Airlines established in 1995
Airlines disestablished in 1996